The Blatenský vrch is one of the mountains over 1,000 metres high in the Ore Mountains of Central Europe in the immediate vicinity of Horní Blatná (Platten mining town).

History 
The mountain massif consists mainly of granite. By the Early Modern Era there was a lively tin and iron ore mining industry in the area of the mountain, on the basis of which, the neighbouring mining town of Platten (now Horní Blatná) was founded in 1532.

Sources 
Reinhart Hepper, Jörg Brückner, Helmut Schmidt: Sächsisch-böhmische Aussichtsberge des westlichen Erzgebirges in Wort und Bild mit touristischen Angaben. Horb am Neckar 2000, S. 27–29.

External links 

Mountains and hills of the Czech Republic
Mountains of the Ore Mountains
One-thousanders of the Czech Republic